The Sri Lankan cricket team toured India in January 2023 to play three One Day International (ODI) and three Twenty20 International (T20I) matches. In December 2022, the Board of Control for Cricket in India (BCCI) confirmed the fixtures.

Squads

On 3 January, Jasprit Bumrah was added to the India's ODI squad. However, on 9 January, Bumrah was pulled out of the squad. On 4 January, Jitesh Sharma replaced injured Sanju Samson in India's T20I squad.

T20I series

1st T20I

2nd T20I

3rd T20I

ODI series

1st ODI

2nd ODI

3rd ODI

Statistics

Most runs (T20I)

Most wickets (T20I)

Most runs (ODI)

Most wickets (ODI)

Sri Lankan cricket team in New Zealand in 2022

References

External links
 Series home at ESPN Cricinfo

International cricket competitions in 2022–23
2023 in Indian cricket
2023 in Sri Lankan cricket
Sri Lankan cricket tours of India